The Forcible Entry Act 1623 (21 Jac 1 c 15) was an Act of the Parliament of the Kingdom of England. It provided that any judge who already had a statutory power, on enquiry, to give restitution of possession of freehold land in respect of which forcible entry or forcible detainer was being committed, was to have the same power, on an indictment for forcible entry or forcible detainer committed in respect of land held for a term of years to give restitution of possession of that land.

See also
Forcible Entry Act

References 
Halsbury's Statutes, Third Edition, volume 18, page 412
The Statutes, Third Revised Edition, HMSO, 1950

Acts of the Parliament of England
1623 in England
1623 in law